Brian Edmund Peter Keenan (January 28, 1943 – October 5, 1985) was an American musician, best known as the drummer for the Chambers Brothers. Born in New York, he also lived in Conisbrough near Doncaster, Yorkshire, England, and Ireland as a child.

Background
Keenan was part of the Chambers Brothers from 1965 to 1971, and also played with the pre-"Doo Wah Diddy Diddy" Manfred Mann group in England. His own group was the house band at Ondine, the first discotheque in New York City.

Career
After playing briefly with Manfred Mann, Keenan returned to New York in the mid-1960s.
Prior to joining The Chambers Brothers, Keenan was a member of the Ondine night club house band, The Losers which was formed around 1965. Referred to as a funky blues rock pop band, the group is said to have been made up pf Joe Nessor (bass and vocal), Tony Sal (Guitar and vocal), Brian Keenan (drums) and a guitarist possibly called Russell. The group is referred to as Reunion in a Chicago Tribune article.

The Chambers Brothers
In 1966 at age 21, he joined The Chambers Brothers.

Bill Graham, the impresario behind the Fillmore West and the Fillmore East, felt that Brian was an exciting live rock drummer.  The few times the Chambers Brothers were not top-billed (not the main act that night) with Brian on drums, the top-billed group was reluctant to follow them because they were intimidated by the Chambers Brothers with Keenan on drums. The Brothers affectionately referred to Brian as Curley and introduced him onstage as Brian "Chambers" Keenan.  The Chambers Brothers predated Sly and the Family Stone as harbingers of psychedelic soul. Keenan also wrote one of its early songs, "Love Me Like the Rain," which appeared on the Shout album. Keenan left the group in 1971 after major financial abuses by the group's management were unresolved.

Later years
He started up his own recording studio in Connecticut.

Death and legacy
Keenan suffered a fatal heart attack on October 5, 1985, at age 42. Keenan is buried at Queen of Peace cemetery in Stamford, Connecticut. He leaves one child, a daughter, also a drummer.

References

Links
 Discogs

1943 births
1985 deaths
20th-century American drummers
American male drummers
The Chambers Brothers members
20th-century American male musicians